In mathematics,  Al-Salam–Carlitz polynomials U(x;q) and V(x;q) are two families of basic hypergeometric orthogonal polynomials in the basic Askey scheme, introduced by .  give a detailed list of their properties.

Definition

The Al-Salam–Carlitz polynomials are given in terms of basic hypergeometric functions by

References

Further reading
 Wang, M. (2009). -integral representation of the Al-Salam–Carlitz polynomials. Applied Mathematics Letters, 22(6), 943-945.
 Askey, R., & Suslov, S. K. (1993). The -harmonic oscillator and the Al-Salam and Carlitz polynomials. Letters in Mathematical Physics, 29(2), 123-132.
 Chen, W. Y., Saad, H. L., & Sun, L. H. (2010). An operator approach to the Al-Salam–Carlitz polynomials. Journal of Mathematical Physics, 51(4).
 Kim, D. (1997). On combinatorics of Al-Salam Carlitz polynomials. European Journal of Combinatorics, 18(3), 295-302.
 Andrews, G. E. (2000). Schur's theorem, partitions with odd parts and the Al-Salam-Carlitz polynomials. Contemporary Mathematics, 254, 45-56.
 Baker, T. H., & Forrester, P. J. (2000). Multivariable Al–Salam & Carlitz Polynomials Associated with the Type A –Dunkl Kernel. Mathematische Nachrichten, 212(1), 5-35.

Orthogonal polynomials
Special functions
Q-analogs